This article outlines the command and control structure of the European Union's missions, which are deployed as part of the Common Security and Defence Policy (CSDP). This structure ranges from the political strategic level to the tactical level.

At the military/civilian strategic level, missions are commanded by an operation headquarters (OHQ). For all civilian missions the Civilian Planning and Conduct Capability (CPCC) serves this purpose. For each military mission an OHQ is chosen from a list of available facilities. The European Union (EU) does not have a permanent military command structure along the lines of the North Atlantic Treaty Organization's (NATO) Allied Command Operations (ACO), although it has been agreed that ACO resources may be used for the conduct of the EU's CSDP missions. The Military Planning and Conduct Capability (MPCC), established in 2017 and to be strengthened in 2020, does however represent the EU's first step in developing a permanent OHQ.

The MPCC and CPCC are counterparts that cooperate through the Joint Support Coordination Cell (JSCC).

The CPCC, MPCC and JSCC are all part of the External Action Service (EEAS), and situated in the Kortenberg building in Brussels, Belgium.

Overview

Civilian missions

Strategic level

All civilian missions are directed on the strategic level by the Civilian Planning and Conduct Capability (CPCC), a directorate of the External Action Service (EEAS) in Brussels, Belgium. The Director of the CPCC acts as Civilian Operation Commander (Civ OpCdr).

Operational level
The CPCC directs the subordinate Head of Mission (HoM), who administers the mission on the operational level.

Military missions and operations

Strategic level

Command options for EU-led missions
For each military mission (certain missions are also referred to as operation), the Council nominates a dedicated OHQ. This section outlines the main options for OHQ.

Autonomous operations and missions
 Military Planning and Conduct Capability (MPCC) of the EEAS' Military Staff (EUMS) in Brussels, Belgium
Established in 2017, the MPCC is the EU's first permanent OHQ and supersedes the previous EU OPCEN. At present it may run only non-executive operations, but will by the end of 2020 the MPCC will also be capable of running executive operations of up to 2500 troops (i.e. the size of one battle group).
National OHQ offered by member states:
 (CPCO) in Paris, France
 Armed Forces Operational Command (EinsFüKdoBw) in Potsdam, Germany
 (EL EU OHQ) in Larissa, Greece
 Italian Joint Force Headquarters (ITA-JFHQ) in Centocelle, Rome, Italy
 (see :es:Mando de Operaciones, the Spanish national nucleus of the HQ).

The practice of activating ad hoc national OHQs has been criticised as being inefficient due to high start-up costs and fact that their temporary nature to a certain extent prevents the staff forming a strong working relationships and ‘collective memory’.

Operations with recourse to NATO assets and capabilities

: An OHQ would be set up within the Supreme Headquarters Allied Powers Europe (SHAPE) in Mons, Belgium. SHAPE is the main headquarters of Allied Command Operations (ACO).

The Berlin Plus agreement requires that the use of NATO assets by the EU is subject to a "right of first refusal", i.e. NATO must first decline to intervene in a given crisis, and contingent on unanimous approval among NATO states, including those outside of the EU. For example, Turkish reservations about Operation Concordia using NATO assets delayed its deployment by more than five months.

Operation Commander
Each OHQ is led by an Operation Commander (OpCdr).

When the MPCC acts as OHQ, the OpCdr is the MPCC Director, who is also Director General of the European Union Military Staff (EUMS).

When the NCS provides the OHQ, the OpCdr is the Deputy Supreme Allied Commander Europe (DSACEUR).

Operational level
The OHQ directs the subordinate Force Headquarters (FHQ), which carries out the operation on the tactical level (i.e. on the ground). The FHQ is led by a Force Commander (FCdr).

In case the MPCC acts as OHQ, the FHQ is termed Mission Force Headquarters (MFHQ) instead. The MFHQ is led by a Mission Force Commander (MFCdr).

Tactical level
The FCdr/MFCdr directs Component Commanders (CCs) for all service branches that may be required as part of the operation. The military forces within each component is subordinate to the CC.

Civilian-military coordination
In the event that both a military and civilian mission are in the field, the military OHQ and its Operation Commander (OpCdr) coordinate relations on the strategic level horizontally with the Civilian Planning and Conduct Capability (CPCC) and its Civilian Operation Commander (Civ OpCdr). Equally, on the tactical level the military Force Headquarters (FHQ) and its Force Commander (FCdr) coordinate relations horizontally with the civilian Head of Mission (HoM).

If the Military Planning and Conduct Capability acts as OHQ, it will coordinate its relations with the CPCC through the Joint Support Coordination Cell (JSCC).

See also
Command and control
Structure of the Common Security and Defence Policy
List of military and civilian missions of the European Union
Berlin Plus agreement
Structure of NATO

References

External links
European Union Concept for Command and Control, European External Action Service
STRATEGIC COMMAND AND CONTROL (C2) SYSTEM FOR CSDP MISSIONS AND OPERATIONS, Permanent Structured Cooperation

Military of the European Union
European Union